The South Australian Patriotic Football League or Patriotic League was a short lived Australian rules football wartime competition formed during World War I in South Australia to fill the void left by the South Australian Football League (SAFL) which elected to go into recess at the time. Games held were used to raise funds for the war effort. The SAFL was opposed to the formation of the Patriotic League and refused to recognise it during and after World War I.

In the first season of the Patriotic League the competition raised between £350 to £400 for the war effort and Australian soldiers. By 1918 some Patriotic League matches were raising £1,000 per game.

The Patron of the Patriotic League, Francis (Frank) Walter Lundie, and the Delegate for West Adelaide, Albert (Bert) Augustine Edwards, were Councillors for the City of Adelaide in Grey Ward, the area mainly associated with the West Adelaide Football Club (Bert Edwards was their President). Despite being anti-conscription Labor men, they were patriots and supported the war effort.

Participating teams

Three seasons 
 Port Adelaide
 North Adelaide (playing as 'Prospect')
 West Torrens

Two seasons 
 West Adelaide

One season 
 South Australian Railways
 South Adelaide 
 Sturt
 St Francis Xavier
 South Australian Police
 Norwood
 Mitcham
 Kenilworth

Patriotic League premiers

References

Australian rules football governing bodies
1916 establishments in Australia
Defunct Australian rules football competitions in South Australia